94.3 Radio One is a commercial radio network in India owned by HT Media. It has stations in Mumbai, Delhi, Bangalore, Ahmedabad, Chennai, Kolkata and Pune.

History
The newspaper Mid-Day founded the station as Radio Midday in Mumbai, which was re-launched in 2002 as Go 92.5, an English-language (later also Hindi) radio station, by operating on the 92.5 MHz brand before relaunching itself as Radio One with a new frequency in 2006.

The network is one of the few broadcasting in English (called "international format") in all of India's three biggest cities: Mumbai, Delhi and Bangalore. Targeting an upscale sophisticated audience. All stations broadcast at 94.3 MHz except the one in Ahmedabad which is at 95.0 MHz.

94.3 Radio One was ranked as India's most attractive radio brand 2017 (out of two radio brands listed), and at place 531 among all brands, in the annual publication India's Most Attractive Brands.

The network is owned by Next Radio Ltd., a subsidiary of Next MediaWorks. The former Managing Director and CEO of Next Radio was Vineet Singh Hukmani. He was also a shareholder director in the company.

Next MediaWorks, the owner of Radio One, was bought by HT Media in 2019, thus expanding Hindustan Times FM service with three brands. (Fever 104 FM , Radio Nasha and Radio One).

94.3 Radio One Delhi, Mumbai and Bangalore also stream live on ONLINE at http://1cast.in (World Wide Web URL) AND the company has also launched India's first online audio business channel - Business ONE, in January 2018  (the business channel operates 9am-4pm mon-fri).

94.3 Radio One celebrated its 11th anniversary in September 2018 by launching a pioneering 'audience tracker' , the first by any media company in India, that tracks the consumption habits of its upscale audience across brands and categories

94.3 Radio One is the first media brand in India to win the famed PHILIP KOTLER award for excellence in Marketing Differentiation

About
Radio One runs India's largest International format Radio Network in Delhi, Mumbai and Bangalore. Radio One appeals to intelligent and evolved listeners – which the brand calls "International Indians”. The international Indians live in India, geographically, but are at par on psychographics, with their global counterparts - in terms of awareness, sensibilities and motivations. They cherish uniqueness - unique taste in music is symbolic of the unique trail of their lives. They prefer international music - it maybe something they have grown up listening to or it simply sets them apart as listeners – in any case, it showcases their evolved taste. They are determinedly individualistic in the way they obtain and use information, make choices and create opinions. Their ears are open to music, talks, and shows, etc. which are peppered with a dose of uniqueness. It’s this strong sense of self and individual identity which makes them want to be distinctive and discerning in their lifestyle choices, which also manifests in their choice of content. They are what they consume. Radio One gives its listeners exactly this and more. With content pegged in five major buckets which resonates with its audience, the brand has successfully built communities around food, music, sports, travel and fitness and gone way beyond just music. With shows that showcase global lifestyle related to travel, food, cinema backed by experiences of celebrities such as Ranveer Singh, Rajeev Masand, to globally celebrated RJs like Ryan Seacrest, Casey Kasem, to associations with global events like U2 concert, or global brands such as Hard Rock Café, Radio One truly emerges as India’s favorite global lifestyle destination.   The brand has also built various path breaking properties and associations with Sula Fest and VH1 Supersonic – which has emerged as the country’s most valued multi-genre music and experiential festival. The recent wave of Start-ups gets satiated by the brand’s exclusive property – Start-up Sit-down, which features established start-up founders, highlights their journeys thereby inspiring all the budding founders and entrepreneurs. Radio One is operational in 7 Indian cities namely Delhi, Mumbai, Bangalore, Kolkata, Chennai, Pune and Ahmedabad. It runs India's largest International format Radio Network in Delhi, Mumbai and Bangalore; the CHR format in Pune and Ahmedabad; Hindi Retro format in Kolkata, and cool Tamil format in Chennai.   Radio One is part of the Fever Network which houses three distinct radio stations – Fever FM, Radio Nasha and Radio One. The Fever Network spans across 22 stations and 15 cities, providing the widest array of content, music and advertising options for our listeners and advertisers.

References

Radio stations in Kolkata

External links
 
 

Radio stations in Mumbai
Mass media in Pune
Radio stations in Indore
Radio stations in Bhopal
Radio stations in Bangalore
English-language mass media in India
Hindustan Times
Radio stations established in 2002
Radio stations established in 2006
Hindi-language radio stations
English-language radio stations